Charlotte Ah Tye Chang (July 21, 1873 – January 15, 1972) was an American social worker and community activist in the San Francisco area. As a California-born Chinese-American woman, her citizenship status became complicated after she married a Chinese-born lawyer, Hong Yen Chang, in 1897. Late in life, she protested the demolition of the Kong Chow Temple in San Francisco's Chinatown.

Early life 
Charlotte Ah Tye was born in La Porte, California, the daughter of merchant Yee Ah Tye and Chan Shi Ah Tye. Both of her parents were born in Guangdong, China. She and her sister Alice were educated partly at an English school in Hong Kong.

Citizenship and work in California 
Charlotte Ah Tye married Chinese-born lawyer Hong Yen Chang in 1897, in San Francisco. They had two children, Ora Ivy Chang (1898-1929) and Oliver Carrington Chang (1900-1973). In 1906, Charlotte Chang and her two children survived the great San Francisco earthquake, staying with friends and helping with church relief efforts in Oakland.

American women lost their United States citizenship when they married foreign nationals, before the Cable Act of 1922. In 1910, planning to travel from San Francisco to Vancouver, Charlotte Ah Tye Chang and her children applied for return certificates but were refused; although they were all born in California, they could not claim United States citizenship. The family lived in Vancouver from 1910 to 1913 while Hong Yen Chang was a diplomat at the Chinese consulate there, in Washington in 1913 and 1914, and in Berkeley from 1916.

In widowhood, Charlotte Chang worked at the Oakland International Institute branch of the YWCA as a "nationality worker", from 1928 into the 1930s. She is considered one of the first Chinese-American social workers in the San Francisco area. She also volunteered at the Oak Knoll Naval Hospital. She applied again to have her American citizenship reinstated in 1935.

Kong Chow Temple 
In 1968 and 1969, while in her nineties, Chang led protests against plans to demolish the old Kong Chow Temple, established on land her father donated in 1854 for the purpose. Her niece, artist Nanying Stella Wong, joined her efforts. The temple was ultimately demolished; Chang did not live to see the new Kong Chow Temple erected at another location in 1977.

Personal life 
Charlotte Ah-Tye Chang was widowed when Hong Yen Chang died in 1926. Her daughter died in a car accident in 1929. Charlotte Chang died in Berkeley in 1972, aged 98 years. Her gravesite is in Oakland. The Hong Yen Chang papers at the Huntington Library includes photographs and correspondence of Charlotte Ah Tye Chang, including her letters from Soong Ching-ling, wife of Sun Yat-Sen.

References

External links 

 A photograph of Charlotte Ah Tye Chang, taken about 1910, in the Hong Yen Chang papers, at the Huntington Library.
 A photograph of the Chang family, taken about 1910, in the Hong Yen Chang papers, at the Huntington Library.

1873 births
1972 deaths
People from Plumas County, California
Activists from California
American social workers
Social workers
American people of Chinese descent